MacSharry is a surname. Notable people with the surname include:

Marc MacSharry (born 1973), Irish politician
Ray MacSharry (born 1938), Irish politician

See also
McSharry